Erroll Brown Davis Jr. (born August 5, 1944) is an American administrator and businessman.

Erroll earned a Bachelor of Science in electrical engineering from Carnegie Mellon University in 1965 and an MBA in finance from the University of Chicago in 1967.

Previously, Davis served as the superintendent of the Atlanta Public Schools school district in Atlanta, Georgia. He also served as the Chancellor of the University System of Georgia, where he was responsible for the state's 35 public colleges and universities. He has also served as the Chairman of the Board at Alliant Energy Corporation and President/CEO of WPL Holdings, and a chairman of the Carnegie Mellon University board of trustees.

Davis is a former Democratic member of the Pennsylvania House of Representatives.

From 1998 to 2010, he was a non-executive director of multinational oil company BP plc.

In July 2011, Davis was appointed as APS's interim superintendent, to serve the position until June 30, 2012.

Davis currently serves as a member of the Board of Curators for the Georgia Historical Society. He was also elected a member of the National Academy of Engineering in 2021 for leadership in research and development of renewable resources integration with the grid, and public education.

References

Democratic Party members of the Pennsylvania House of Representatives
1944 births
Living people
Chancellors of the Georgia Board of Regents
Directors of BP
PPG Industries people
American chief executives of education-related organizations
American corporate directors
American chairpersons of corporations